Lilja Dögg Alfreðsdóttir (born 4 October 1973) is an Icelandic politician, and was the Icelandic Minister of Education, Science and Culture 2017 – 2021. On 28 November 2021 she got a different portfolio and is now Minister of Tourism, Trade and Culture. She is a member of the Althing (Iceland's parliament) for the Reykjavík South constituency since 2016.

She has worked for the International Monetary Fund, the Icelandic Central Bank and was an economic advisor to Sigmundur Davíð Gunnlaugsson during his time as prime minister. Lilja was the Minister of Foreign Affairs in Sigurður Ingi Jóhannson's cabinet from 2016 to 2017, and has been the deputy chairperson of the Progressive Party since 2016.
She has criticised Disney for having too few films and programmes with subtitles or dubbed in Icelandic. In 2021 she wrote to Tim Cook, CEO of tech giant Apple, asking him to help maintain Icelandic as a language by including it in the voice, text and language collection in their operative systems.

References

1973 births
Living people
Lilja Dogg Alfredsdottir
Lilja Dogg Alfredsdottir
Lilja Dogg Alfredsdottir
Female foreign ministers
Lilja Dogg Alfredsdottir
Lilja Dogg Alfredsdottir
Lilja Dogg Alfredsdottir
Female defence ministers